George Williamson may refer to:

George Williamson (footballer, born 1925) (1925–1994), English footballer
George Williamson (Australian footballer) (1866–1929), Australian rules footballer
George Hunt Williamson (1926–1986), UFO contactee
George Henry Williamson (1845–1918), British Member of Parliament for Worcester, 1906
George H. Williamson (1872–1936), American architect
George M. Williamson (architect) (1892–1979), American architect
George Williamson (diplomat) (1829–1882), US ambassador
George A. Williamson (born 1938), American politician in the state of Florida
George Williamson (academic) (1898–1968), professor of English
G. C. Williamson (George Charles Williamson, 1858–1942), British art historian, antiquarian, and author

See also
George M. Williamson (disambiguation)